Crepitus is an alleged Roman god of flatulence.  It is unlikely that Crepitus was ever actually worshipped. The only ancient source for the claim that such a god was ever worshipped comes from Christian satire. The name Crepitus standing alone would be an inadequate and unlikely name for such a god in Latin. The god appears, however, in a number of important works of French literature.

Sources of the legend
The origin of the myth is somewhat obscure, as it is possible that the existence of this god is an invention by a satirist. No ancient polytheistic source appears for this deity.

The earliest mention of a god of flatulence is as an Egyptian, not a Roman deity.  This comes from the hostile pen of the author of the Recognitions dubiously attributed to Pope Clement I, in which it is reported that:

alii ... crepitus ventris pro numinibus habendos esse docuerunt.
"others (among the Egyptians) teach that intestinal noise (Latin: crepitus ventris) ought to be regarded as a god."

It is unlikely that Clement I was the author of the extant Recognitiones; these are extant chiefly in a Latin translation, presumably out of the original Greek, made by Tyrannius Rufinus in the late fourth or early fifth century.  The passage of Pseudo-Clement stands within a Western Christian tradition of satire against the variety of minor deities worshipped by classical pagans; similar passages exist in The City of God by Saint Augustine of Hippo, and Tertullian's Ad Nationes.

Robert Burton, in The Anatomy of Melancholy, mentions a god Crepitus Ventris among a variety of other deities allegedly worshipped in classical antiquity:

Lilius Giraldus repeats many of her ceremonies: all affections of the mind were heretofore accounted gods, love, and sorrow, virtue, honour, liberty, contumely, impudency, had their temples, tempests, seasons, Crepitus Ventris, dea Vacuna, dea Cloacina, there was a goddess of idleness, a goddess of the draught, or jakes, Prema, Premunda, Priapus, bawdy gods, and gods for all offices.

Burton cites a work called Syntagma de Diis ("A Compendium of the Gods") by Lilius Giraldus as his source for the existence of such a god; by this reference, Burton probably meant Giraldus' Historia de diis gentium ("History of the Pagan Gods"); but because Burton wrote in what he called an "extemporean" style, quicquid in buccam venit ("whatever came into his head"), Burton's quotations and references are not always reliable.  Because of Burton's mixed Latin and English style, this passage may not say that there was a god named "Crepitus Ventris", (Latin for "intestinal noise"), but only that there was a god of intestinal noise.  The Latin word crepitus, moreover, did not exclusively mean the sound generated by intestinal gas; it referred to squeaks, groans, knocks, and any nondescript noise in general.  In The City of God, Augustine elsewhere refers to crepitus cymbalorum, the clang of cymbals.  Medical jargon gives the name crepitus to the creaking or popping noises made by the joints.  The Latin word for "to fart" is pēdere.

Voltaire, in a passage of his Philosophical Dictionary devoted to changing conceptions of deity, alludes to a number of real or alleged Roman deities of a less exalted status:

La déesse des tétons, dea Rumilia; la déesse de l’action du mariage, dea Pertunda; le dieu de la chaise percée, deus Stercutius; le dieu Pet, deus Crepitus, ne sont pas assurément bien vénérables. . .  Il est sûr que deus Crepitus, le dieu Pet, ne donnait pas la même idée que deus divum et hominum sator, la source des dieux et des hommes.
"The goddess of breasts, dea Rumilia; the goddess of the marital act, dea Pertunda; the god of the toilet, deus Stercutius; the god Fart, deus Crepitus, were surely not quite objects of reverence. . . It is certain that deus Crepitus, the god Fart, did not give the same sort of idea as deus divum et hominum sator, the creator of gods and men."
 — "Polytheism", entry in the Philosophical Dictionary of Voltaire.

Through these passages, the noun Crepitus moves from a common noun to a proper noun.  Previous authorities had only claimed that the ancient polytheists, whether Egyptian or Roman, worshipped a god of intestinal noises.  Perhaps in Burton's mention, and certainly in Voltaire, Crepitus is the name of a god of flatulence.

In Baudelaire
Baudelaire criticised both the need of religion and the mediocrity of neopagan artists in the essay "The Pagan School" ("L'École païenne"):
Pastiche ! pastiche ! Vous avez sans doute perdu votre âme quelque part, dans quelque mauvais endroit, pour que vous couriez ainsi à travers le passé comme des corps vides pour en ramasser une de rencontre dans les détritus anciens ? Qu'attendez-vous du ciel ou de la sottise du public ? Une fortune suffisante pour élever dans vos mansardes des autels à Priape et à Bacchus ? Les plus logiques d'entre vous seront les plus cyniques. Ils en élèveront au dieu Crepitus.
"Pastiche! pastiche! You must have all surely lost your soul somewhere, in some bad place, to be thus running now through the past as emptied carcasses, trying to pick one up from the ancient detritus on stumbling on it by haphazard. Have you not? What are you expecting of the heavens or the folly of the public? Could it be a fortune swollen enough to raise altars to Priapus and Bacchus upon your mansard roofs? The most sane amongst you shall be those most cynical: they shall raise it in honour of the god Crepitus."

In Flaubert
Relying on Voltaire's account, Gustave Flaubert put a memorable speech into the mouth of the alleged deity Crepitus in The Temptation of Saint Anthony:
CREPITUS: Moi aussi l'on m'honora jadis. On me faisait des libations. Je fus un Dieu!
L'Athénien me saluait comme un présage de fortune, tandis que le Romain dévot me maudissait les poings levés et que le pontife d'Égypte, s'abstenant de fèves, tremblait à ma voix et pâlissait à mon odeur.
Quand le vinaigre militaire coulait sur les barbes non rasées, qu'on se régalait de glands, de pois et d'oignons crus et que le bouc en morceaux cuisait dans le beurre rance des pasteurs, sans souci du voisin, personne alors ne se gênait. Les nourritures solides faisaient les digestions retentissantes. Au soleil de la campagne, les hommes se soulageaient avec lenteur.
J'ai eu mes jours d'orgueil. Le bon Aristophane me promena sur la scène, et l'empereur Claudius Drusus me fit asseoir à sa table. Dans les laticlaves des patriciens j'ai circulé majestueusement! Les vases d'or, comme des tympanons, résonnaient sous moi;--et quand plein de murènes, de truffes et de pâtés, l'intestin du maître se dégageait avec fracas, l'univers attentif apprenait que César avait dîné!

"I once was honoured.  Libations were made to me.  I was a God!
"The Athenian once hailed me as a favourable omen, while the pious Roman cursed me with raised fists, and the pontiff of Egypt, abstinent from beans, trembled at my voice and paled at my odour. . .
"When the army vinegar ran down unshaven beards, when men helped themselves to acorns, peas, and raw onions, and cooked chopped up goat meat in shepherds' rank butter — never mind your neighbour — no one was embarrassed by me.  Solid foods made for sound digestions.  In the sun of the countryside, men took their ease at their leisure. . .
"I had my glory days.  Jolly Aristophanes placed me on the stage, and the emperor Claudius Drusus had me sitting at his table.  I made the rounds majestically in the laticlaves of patricians!  The golden vessels resounded under me like kettledrums — and when stuffed with lamprey, truffles, and pâtés, the intestine of the Master noisily emptied itself, an attentive universe learned that Caesar had dined!"

A modern invention
While Flaubert learned from his friend Fréderic Baudry, who in turn had consulted Alfred Maury, that "poor little Deus Crepitus does not exist; it's a modern invention," he liked his text so much that he left him in.  While it is unlikely that the god Crepitus ever existed, the scene from Aristophanes is genuine; in The Clouds Athenians compare thunder to the sound of celestial flatulence.

References

Roman gods
Fictional gods
Toilet gods
Flatulence